Beautiful Minds is a British documentary television programme, produced by BBC and broadcast on BBC Four. The first series aired in April 2010, and the second series in April 2012. Each series consists of three episodes.

Overview
The programme features significant British scientists who describe their big moment or discovery.

Episodes

Series 1 (2010)

Series 2 (2012)

References

External links
 

2010s British documentary television series
2010 British television series debuts
2012 British television series endings
BBC television documentaries
Documentary television shows about evolution